Sesar is a village in Bagh District of Azad Kashmir. It is located in Dheerkot tehsil. It was affected by the 2005 earthquake and also hosted large numbers of refugees.

References

Bagh District